Rokicki (feminine: Rokicka; plural: Rokiccy) is a Polish surname. Notable people include:
 Janusz Rokicki (born 1974), Polish Paralympic athlete
 Konstanty Rokicki (1899–1958), Polish diplomat
 Michał Rokicki (1984–2021), Polish swimmer

See also
 
 Rokita

Polish-language surnames